Count Fyodor Arturovich Keller (October 12 (24), 1857, Kursk – December 8 (21), 1918, Kyiv) was a Russian Imperial General of the cavalry, one of the leaders of the White movement in 1918, and monarchist.

Military career 
Fyodor Arturovich Keller was born in Kursk, to the family of ethnic German General Artur Fyodorovich Keller. He was a cousin of Fyodor Eduardovich Keller, who distinguished himself in the Russo-Japanese war.

Fyodor Keller studied at the preparatory boarding school of Nikolaev Cavalry School, and passed the exam to enter the Tver Cavalry Cadet School in 1878, but after the start of the Russo-Turkish War of 1877–1878, he volunteered for battle. He was awarded the 1st and 2nd class Crosses of St. George for bravery.

After the war he served in the 1st Leib Dragoon Moscow Regiment. He ascended ranks and on February 16, 1904, he was appointed the commander of the 15th Alexander Dragoon Regiment in Kyiv.

From June 1906 he was the commander of the Leib Guards Dragoon Regiment. In 1907, he was awarded the rank of Fliegel-Adjutant and in July of the same year, he was promoted to major general with enrollment in H. I. M. Retinue. 

During the First Russian Revolution between 1905 and 1907, he acted as a provisional Governor-General of Kalisz, and survived two assassination attempts. The first attempt failed when Keller managed to catch a bomb thrown at his carriage, and it failed to explode. In the second attempt, Keller received multiple shrapnel wounds, when a bomb exploded beneath his horse.

On June 14, 1910, he was appointed commander of the 1st brigade of the Caucasus Cavalry Division, and on February 25, 1912, commander of the 10th Cavalry Division. On May 31, 1913, he received the rank of lieutenant general.

When World War I broke out, Keller’s division became part of the 3rd Army of General Nikolai Ruzsky. In August 1914 he defeated the 4th Austro-Hungarian cavalry division in the battle near Yaroslavitsa. During the Battle of Galicia, he organized the pursuit of the enemy and took 500 prisoners and 6 guns near Yavoriv. For services in battle he was awarded the Order of St. George of the 4th (September 1914) and 3rd (May 1915) degrees.

From April 3, 1915, he was the commander of the 3rd cavalry corps. During the offensive at the end of April 1915, he distinguished himself with a successful cavalry attack at Balamutovka and Rzhaventsy, breaking through Austrian fortifications, taking strategically important heights and many prisoners.

During the general offensive of the Southwestern Front in Bukovina in 1916, Keller's corps was part of the 9th Army of General Platon Lechitsky. In early June, Keller's corps, together with the corps of General Mikhail Promtov was ordered to pursue the retreating southern group of the 7th Austro-Hungarian Army. He was conferred the rank of General of the cavalry on 15 January 1917.

Revolution and civil war 
After the February Revolution in 1917, Keller was one of the two Russian generals, along with Huseyn Khan Nakhchivanski, who supported the Czar. Keller sent a telegram to the headquarters of the Supreme Commander-in-Chief to offer Nicholas II the use of his corps for suppression of the revolt, but Nicholas II never received this telegram.

Count Keller refused to take the oath of allegiance to the Russian Provisional Government, and was dismissed from his position. He left for Kharkiv, where his family lived at that time.

Later Keller moved to Kyiv, where on November 19, 1918 he was appointed by hetman Pavlo Skoropadskyi the commander-in-chief of all the troops on the territory of Ukraine. Skoropadskyi needed the support of Russian monarchists in his struggle against the Ukrainian insurgents, but Keller understood the appointment as the beginning of his own dictatorship. Keller instituted a five-member Council of the State Defense, composed entirely of the monarchist politicians, and stated that he served one Russian state. Skoropadskyi dismissed Keller on November 26 for "overstepping his authorities" and replaced him with general Prince Alexander Dolgorukov.

When Kyiv was taken by the troops of Directorate of Ukraine, Keller was arrested and executed. He was buried in Pokrovskyi Monastery in Kyiv.

References 

1857 births
1918 deaths
Russian military personnel of World War I
Imperial Russian Army generals
White movement people
Ukrainian War of Independence
Executed Russian people
Military personnel from Kursk
People executed by Ukraine